The 1980 Texas Longhorns football team represented the University of Texas at Austin in the 1980 NCAA Division I-A football season.  The Longhorns finished the regular season with a 7–4 record and lost to North Carolina in the Astro-Bluebonnet Bowl.

Schedule

Game summaries

Oregon State

Source:

vs. North Carolina (Astro-Bluebonnet Bowl)

Roster

References

Texas
Texas Longhorns football seasons
Texas Longhorns football